Darren Morgan (born 5 November 1967) is an English former professional footballer who played in the Football League, as a midfielder.

References

1967 births
Living people
English footballers
Association football forwards
Footballers from Camberwell
Millwall F.C. players
Bradford City A.F.C. players
Peterborough United F.C. players
Erith & Belvedere F.C. players
English Football League players